Lawson Vaughn (born April 11, 1984 in Charlotte, North Carolina) is a retired American soccer player.

Career

College
Vaughn attended Lassiter High School in his hometown Marietta, GA, and began his college soccer at the University of South Carolina from 2002 to 2003. Appearing in 34 matches in two seasons, he notched one goal and 3 assists.  In 2004, he transferred to the University of Tulsa, where he subsequently appeared in 43 matches in two seasons and managed 3 goals and 7 assists.

Professional
Vaughn was selected in the third round, 25th overall, in the 2006 MLS Supplemental Draft by C.D. Chivas USA. He was waived by Chivas USA in August, 2009. He later signed for D.C. United on September 11, 2009, but was released by the club in March 2010.

References

External links
 MLS player profile

1984 births
Living people
African-American soccer players
American soccer players
Association football defenders
Chivas USA draft picks
Chivas USA players
D.C. United players
Major League Soccer players
Soccer players from Georgia (U.S. state)
South Carolina Gamecocks men's soccer players
Sportspeople from Marietta, Georgia
Tulsa Golden Hurricane men's soccer players
21st-century African-American sportspeople
20th-century African-American people